This is a list of Swedish television related events from 1975.

Events
22 March - The 20th Eurovision Song Contest is held at the Stockholm International Fairs. The Netherlands wins the contest with the song "Ding-a-dong", performed by Teach-In.

Debuts

Television shows
1–24 December - Långtradarchaufförens berättelser

1960s
Hylands hörna (1962-1983)

1970s
Hem till byn (1971-2006)

Ending this year

Births
20 September - Tobbe Blom, TV host & magician
16 November - Jessica Almenäs, TV host & reporter

Deaths

See also
1975 in Sweden

References